Nanohyla annamensis, commonly known as the Annam chorus frog, Annam narrow-mouthed frog, Vietnam rice frog or minute narrow-mouthed frog, is a species of frog in the family Microhylidae. It is found in Cambodia, Laos, Thailand, and Vietnam. Its natural habitats are subtropical or tropical moist lowland forests, subtropical or tropical moist montane forests, swamps, and intermittent freshwater marshes. It is listed as vulnerable by the IUCN Red List due to habitat loss and degradation.

Taxonomy
Nanohyla annamensis was formerly placed in the genus Microhyla, but a 2021 study using morphological and phylogenetic evidence moved nine species (including N. annamensis) to a new genus, Nanohyla.

References

annamensis
Amphibians of Cambodia
Amphibians of Laos
Amphibians of Thailand
Amphibians of Vietnam
Amphibians described in 1923
Taxonomy articles created by Polbot